Craig Wood is an Australian film editor working in America.

Born in Sydney, Wood began his career at the age of 19 as an assistant editor in the Australian Broadcasting Corporation's  documentary department before moving into music video and advertising work. 

He has worked as an editor on almost all of director Gore Verbinski’s films, including the 1996 short film The Ritual, as well as on over a dozen Verbinski-directed commercials, including the Clio Awards and Silver Lion-winning Budweiser "Frogs" (1995).

Selected filmography

Music videos
Alphaville "Mysteries of Love" (1990) (directed by Alex Proyas)
The Smashing Pumpkins "Today" (1993) (directed by Stéphane Sednaoui)
Björk "Big Time Sensuality" (1993) (directed by Stéphane Sednaoui)
Tom Petty and the Heartbreakers "Mary Jane's Last Dance" (1993) (directed by Keir McFarlane)
UB40 "Bring Me Your Cup" (1993) (directed by Keir McFarlane)
Janet Jackson "Any Time, Any Place" (1994) (directed by Keir McFarlane)
Kylie Minogue "Put Yourself in My Place" (1994) (directed by Keir McFarlane)
Monster Magnet "Negasonic Teenage Warhead" (1995) (directed by Gore Verbinski)
Kylie Minogue "Where Is the Feeling?" (1995) (directed by Keir McFarlane)
Tina Turner "Whatever You Want" (1996) (directed by Stéphane Sednaoui)
Janet Jackson "Twenty Foreplay" (1996) (directed by Keir McFarlane)
Garbage "Milk" (1996) (directed by Stéphane Sednaoui)
Fiona Apple "Sleep to Dream" (1997) (directed by Stéphane Sednaoui)

Feature films

See also
 American Cinema Editors awards 2007

References
https://archive.today/20130125153218/http://uk.hollywood.com/films/ring/microsite/crew.htm

External links
 

Australian film editors
American Cinema Editors
Living people
Year of birth missing (living people)
People from Sydney
Australian expatriates in the United States
American film editors